Henry Alan Green is a Professor of Religious Studies at the University of Miami, and has taught there since 1984. After completing postgraduate work at the Hebrew University of Jerusalem, the University of Oxford, and the Sorbonne, he received his Ph.D. in Religion from St. Andrew's University in 1982. He is the published author or co-author of four books and numerous articles, and has received recognition for his work on documenting the exodus of Jews from Arab countries after the Second World War.

Education

Green received his B.A. in Sociology from Carleton University in 1970. He then completed post-baccalaureate work at the Hebrew University of Jerusalem from 1970-1971, before returning to Carleton University for his M.A. in Sociology in 1973. Following that, he completed postgraduate work at the University of Oxford (1974) and the École pratique des hautes études (1975-1976) in Religion and Sociology, before completing his Ph.D. in Divinity at St. Andrew's University in 1982, with a dissertation focused on gnosticism in early Christianity, and its Jewish roots.

Teaching, visiting fellowships, and visiting professorships

Green has been a professor at the University of Miami since 1984. He was Director of the Judaic Studies Program at the University of Miami from its inception in 1984 until 2000, and introduced a Sephardic Studies concentration during his tenure.

In Canada, Green served as a research associate at the Hebrew University of Jerusalem from 1977-1979, Visiting Assistant Professor at the University of Alberta from 1979-1980, and as a Visiting Assistant Professor and Post-Doctoral Fellow at Carleton University from 1981-1983. He also served as a Visiting Assistant Professor in the Department of Classics and Religion at Dickinson College from 1983-1984.

Green was also a Skirball Fellow at the University of Oxford in 1991, served as a University College Fellow at the University of Toronto from 2001-2002, and also served as a Fellow at the Centre for Contemporary Jewry, located in the Hebrew University of Jerusalem, in 2009.

Academic projects

HIPPY USA

During his tenure as a research associate at the Hebrew University of Jerusalem's School of Education from 1977-1979, Green was heavily involved in research examining how to strengthen children's early cognitive skills and parental bonds. This research evolved into an early childhood education program, HIPPY (Home Instruction for Parents of Preschool Youngsters), an evidence-based program that strengthens families and communities by helping parents prepare their children for school success. HIPPY was mentioned in Hillary Clinton's book It Takes a Village as one of the successful organizations helping to empower parents and increase children's cognitive skills and school readiness across the United States, and former President Clinton spoke very highly of HIPPY and Secretary of State Clinton's role in its growth during the 2016 Democratic National Convention. Green was instrumental in exporting the HIPPY model from Israel to the United States and Canada, and served as the national chair of HIPPY USA's Board of Trustees from 2000 to 2003, receiving acknowledgment for his work from Secretary of State Clinton during an awards dinner in 2014. He currently sits on the HIPPY Florida Advisory Committee, and is a former Vice Chair of the Board of Directors in HIPPY Canada.

Jews from Arab Countries and Sephardi Voices
Green is very active as a voice for Sephardi Jews, both in the United States and abroad. He testified before the Congressional Human Rights Caucus in Washington D.C. in 2007, on the topic of truth, justice, and reconciliation for Jewish refugees from Arab countries, and serves on a number of boards for Sephardi-related organizations. In particular, he has been a member of the Executive Committee for Justice for Jews from Arab Countries (JJAC) since 2012, and has been a member of the Academic Advisory Board of the American Sephardi Federation since 2008

Green is also the founder and Executive Director of Sephardi Voices, an international NGO formed in 2009 and dedicated to collecting the testimonies of the "forgotten exodus" of Jews from Arab countries. Sephardi Voices has collected hundreds of audio-visual interviews with Jewish migrants, refugees, and displaced persons from North Africa, Iran, and the Middle East, and its short film What We Left Behind premiered at numerous Jewish film festivals to significant acclaim. His work with Sephardi Voices has garnered recognition from a variety of Jewish publications and various organizations, and he has presented at dozens of conferences on the subjects of oral life-stories, migration and identity, and the importance of including Sephardi history post-colonialism into the narrative of Jewish peoplehood.

South Florida Jewry and the Jewish Museum of Florida

Green is a noted scholar on the subject of American Sephardi and Mizrahi, the sociology of Judaism, and South Florida Jewry. He has published several articles on the subject of Jewish demographics in South Florida, and wrote the biography of Rabbi Leon Kronish, the spiritual leader of Temple Beth Sholom from 1944-1984, and a notable figure both among South Florida Jewry and in American Reform Judaism in general.

He is also the Founding Director of "MOSAIC: Jewish life in Florida", a project conceived in 1985. The project morphed into a traveling exhibit, with documents and artifacts of Floridian Jewish life sourced by volunteers and coordinators from all across the state, with an accompanying exhibit guidebook. After a national tour that ended in 1995, MOSAIC became the core exhibit of the newly minted Jewish Museum of Florida, today a project of Florida International University, and the Museum is housed out of the first synagogue ever built on Miami Beach (1929). Congresswoman Ileana Ros-Lehtinen recently toured the Museum with Green, and later applauded the Museum's work in a session of the House of Representatives.

Judaism and Early Christianity
Green is a noted scholar on the sociological origins of Gnosticism, and its reliance on Judaism as a foundational element. He has written extensively on the subject, and the book based on his dissertation is viewed as the most significant contribution to the sociological origins of gnosticism, three decades after its publication.

Selected works
 Green, Henry Alan; Cohen, Jane. Research in Action. HaMakor Press, Hebrew University of Jerusalem, 1979.
 Green, Henry Alan. The Economic and Social Origins of Gnosticism. Scholars Press, Atlanta, 1985.
 Green, Henry Alan; Zerivitz, Marcia. MOSAIC: Jewish Life in Florida. MOSAIC Inc./University Presses of Florida, Miami, and Gainesville, 1991.
 Green, Henry. "Power and Knowledge: A Study in the Social Development of Early Christianity". Studies in Religion 20/2, 1991, 217-231.
 Green, Henry. "Sefardies en la Florida". Magen 81/2, 1991, 29-35.
 Green, Henry Alan. Gesher VaKesher—Bridges and Bonds: The Life of Leon Kronish. Printed as part of South Florida Studies in the History of Judaism series, Scholars' Press, 1995.
 Green, Henry. "Jews in Miami". South Florida History 26/4, 1998, 10-13.
 Green, Henry. "Leon Kronish: Miami Beach's 20th Century Prophet". In Greenbaum, Andrea (ed.). Jews of South Florida, Brandeis University, Waltham, 2005, 162-178.
 Green, Henry; Necoechea, Denise. HIPPY Health Curriculum. University of South Florida, Tampa, 2006; reprinted 2010.
 Green, Henry. "Transnational Identity and Miami Sephardim". In Bejerano, Margalit; Aizenberg, Edna (eds.). Contemporary Sephardic Identity in the Americas, Syracuse University Press, Syracuse, 2012, 124-140.

References

External links 
 Sephardi Voices official website
 HIPPY Canada website
 HIPPY USA website

Year of birth missing (living people)
Living people
University of Miami faculty
Carleton University alumni
Hebrew University of Jerusalem alumni
Alumni of the University of Oxford
École pratique des hautes études alumni